Reina de la Noche is the ninth album by Mexican iconic pop singer Verónica Castro. It was released in 1987.
"Mala Noche... ¡No!" is the theme song to  Verónica Castro's Hit show of the same name. Verónica Castro was filming the telenovela Rosa salvaje at the time.  Due to the success of her album, "Reina de la Noche," she was invited to perform in the 30th anniversary celebration of Viña Del Mar.

Track listing
 "Reina de la noche"  (Rudy Pérez-Manny Benito)
 "Brujo"  (Sergio Mendez)
 "Mala Noche... ¡No!"  ("Ma la Notte No") (Verónica Castro-Toto Otuño) 
 "Ni amigos, ni amantes"  (Rudy Pérez-Manny Benito) 
 "Espinita"  (Nico Jiménez)
 "Semaforo"  (Mario Patiño)
 "Loca"  (José Luis Piloto)
 "Rosa salvaje"  (José Antonio 'Potro' Farías)  
 "Me Vale"  (Maria Esther Aguirre de Rodriguez)
 "Un poco de mi"  (Willy Chirino)

Sencillos

1987 albums
Verónica Castro albums